Babanrao Dattatray Yadav (Lonikar) (born 1 March 1965) is an Indian politician from Maharashtra state & Member in 13th 2014 Maharashtra Legislative Assembly election. He was Minister of Water Supply and Sanitation in Government of Maharashtra. He represents Partur-Mantha Vidhan Sabha Constituency in Legislative Assembly of Maharashtra. He belongs to Bhartiya Janata Party.

Political career
Babanrao Yadav is 55 years old MLA contested election from Partur, Maharashtra in the year 2019 and he won. Nowadays, he is associated with the Bharatiya Janata Party. Also, he was elected as Member of Maharashtra Legislative Assembly from Partur constituency in the years 1999, 2004 and 2014, respectively. Babanrao Yadav is also known as Babanrao Lonikar.

Positions held
He was also given responsibility of being guardian minister of Jalna district.

Within BJP

State Vice President, BJP (1994)

Legislative

 Member of Maharashtra Legislative Assembly in 2014
 Member of Maharashtra Legislative Assembly in 2004-2009

References

Maharashtra MLAs 2004–2009
Maharashtra MLAs 2014–2019
Living people
1961 births
People from Jalna district
People from Marathwada
Bharatiya Janata Party politicians from Maharashtra
Marathi politicians